The Mirage 25 is a Canadian sailboat that was designed by American Robert Perry and first built in 1982.

Production
The boat was built by Mirage Yachts in Pointe Claire, Quebec, Canada, starting in 1982, but is now out of production.

Design

The Mirage 25 is a small recreational keelboat, built predominantly of fiberglass, with wood trim. It has a transom-hung rudder and a fixed fin keel.

See also
List of sailing boat types

Similar sailboats
Bayfield 25
Bombardier 7.6
Cal 25
Cal 2-25
C&C 25
Capri 25
Catalina 25
Catalina 250
Com-Pac 25
Dufour 1800
Freedom 25
Hunter 25.5
Jouët 760
Kelt 7.6
Kirby 25
MacGregor 25
Merit 25
Northern 25
O'Day 25
Redline 25
Sirius 26
Tanzer 25
US Yachts US 25
Watkins 25

References

External links

Keelboats
1970s sailboat type designs
Sailing yachts
Sailboat type designs by Robert Perry
Sailboat types built by Mirage Yachts